In computer science, a computation history is a sequence of steps taken by an abstract machine in the process of computing its result.  Computation histories are frequently used in proofs about the capabilities of certain machines, and particularly about the undecidability of various formal languages.

Formally, a computation history is a (normally finite) sequence of configurations of a formal automaton.  Each configuration fully describes the status of the machine at a particular point.  To be valid, certain conditions must hold:
 the first configuration must be a valid initial configuration of the automaton and
 each transition between adjacent configurations must be valid according to the transition rules of the automaton.
In addition, to be complete, a computation history must be finite and
 the final configuration must be a valid terminal configuration of the automaton.
The definitions of "valid initial configuration", "valid transition", and "valid terminal configuration" vary for different kinds of formal machines.

A deterministic automaton has exactly one computation history for a given initial configuration, though the history may be infinite and therefore incomplete.

Finite State Machines 
For a finite state machine , a configuration is simply
the current state of the machine, together with the remaining input. A transition from a configuration  to
a configuration  is allowed if  for
some input symbol  and if  has a transition from
The final
configuration must have the empty string  as its remaining
input;  whether  has accepted or rejected the input depends
on whether the final state is an accepting state.

Turing Machines 

Computation histories are more commonly used in reference to Turing machines.  The configuration of a single-tape Turing machine consists of the contents of the tape, the position of the read/write head on the tape, and the current state of the associated state machine;  this is usually written

where  is the current state of the machine, represented in some
way that's distinguishable from the tape language, and where  is
positioned immediately before the position of the read/write head.

Consider a Turing machine  on input .  The first
configuration must be , where 
is the initial state of the Turing machine.  The machine's state in the final
configuration must be either  (the accept state) or 
(the reject state).  A configuration  is a valid successor
to configuration  if there's a transition from the state in
tape and moves the read/write head in a way that produces the result in
.

Decidability results 

Computation histories can be used to show that certain problems for
pushdown automata are undecidable.  This is because the language of
non-accepting computation histories of a Turing machine 
on input  is a context-free language recognizable by a
non-deterministic pushdown automaton.

We encode a Turing computation history  as the
string , where 
is the encoding of configuration , as discussed above, and where
every other configuration is written in reverse.  Before reading a particular
configuration, the pushdown automaton makes a non-deterministic choice
to either ignore the configuration or read it completely onto the stack.

 If the pushdown automaton decides to ignore the configuration, it simply reads and discards it completely and makes the same choice for the next one.
Since successive configurations are always written in opposite orders, this can be done by, for each tape symbol in the new configuration, popping off a symbol from the stack and checking if they're the same. If, at any point, the automaton decides that the transition is invalid, it immediately enters a special accept state which ignores the rest of the input and accepts at the end.

In addition, the automaton verifies that the first configuration is the correct
initial configuration (if not, it accepts) and that the state of the final
configuration of the history is the accept state (if not, it accepts).  Since
a non-deterministic automaton accepts if there's any valid way for it to accept,
the automaton described here will discover if the history is not a valid
accepting history and will accept if so, and reject if not. 

This same trick cannot be used to recognize accepting computation histories
with an NPDA, since non-determinism could be used to skip past a test that would
otherwise fail.  A linear-bounded Turing machine is sufficient to recognize
accepting computation histories.

This result allows us to prove that , the language
of pushdown automata which accept all input, is undecidable.  Suppose
we have a decider for it, .  For any Turing machine
 and input , we can form the pushdown automaton
 which accepts non-accepting computation histories for that
machine.   will accept if and only if there are no
would allow us to decide , which we know to be undecidable.

References

Theory of computation